Dani Ayman Kiki (born 8 January 1988) is a retired Bulgarian professional footballer, who played as a midfielder. He is of Syrian Kurdish descent, as his father is from Syria.

Career

Early career
Kiki started to play football in the private junior football academy Botev 2002 in Plovdiv. His first coach was Marin Bakalov. In 2004, at the age of 16, he went to Spartak Plovdiv.

Lokomotiv Plovdiv
In 2006, only 18 years old, Dani Kiki signed his first professional contract with Lokomotiv Plovdiv.

Kiki made his official debut in the Bulgarian first division in a match against Lokomotiv Sofia on 17 September 2006 as a 77th-minute substitute and played for 13 minutes. The result of the match was a 0:2 loss for The Smurfs.

Six days later, Kiki scored his first goal for Lokomotiv Plovdiv against PFC Chernomorets Burgas Sofia. He netted a goal in the 90th minute. The result of the match was a 6:0 win for Loko.

On 31 October 2009, he was involved in a brawl, along with several other players, following his team's 0-1 loss to Botev Plovdiv.

Chernomorets Burgas
After a five-year spell at Lauta and some problems with the club, Kiki was released from Lokomotiv Plovdiv. He relocated to Burgas, to sign a contract with Chernomorets Burgas. He was released in January 2012.

Return to Lokomotiv Plovdiv
On 29 October 2016 he scored the winning goal for Lokomotiv Plovdiv in the game against CSKA Sofia.

Cherno More Varna
On 16 January 2018 Kiki joined Cherno More Varna after he had left Lokomotiv Plovdiv in the end of 2017.

Career statistics

International career
In November 2007 of that time the Bulgarian national under-21 coach Aleksandar Stankov called Kiki up for Bulgaria national under-21 football team for a matches with England U21 and Ireland U21. On 16 November 2007, on stadium:mk in Milton Keynes he made his official debut for Bulgaria U21 against England U21. For Bulgaria U21, Kiki was capped five times.

References

External links 
 Profile at lportala.net
 

1988 births
Living people
Bulgarian footballers
First Professional Football League (Bulgaria) players
PFC Lokomotiv Plovdiv players
PFC Chernomorets Burgas players
FC Lokomotiv 1929 Sofia players
PFC Cherno More Varna players
Bulgarian people of Syrian descent
Syrian Kurdish people
Association football midfielders